Otitoma aureolineata is a species of sea snail, a marine gastropod mollusc in the family Pseudomelatomidae.

Description
The length of the shell varies between 15 mm and 19 mm.

Distribution
This marine species occurs off Aliguay Island, Dipolog, Mindanao, Philippines

References

 Stahlschmidt P., Poppe G.T. & Tagaro S.P. (2018). Descriptions of remarkable new turrid species from the Philippines. Visaya. 5(1): 5-64. page(s): 25, pl. 19 figs 1-3.

External links
 Gastropods.com: Otitoma aureolineata

aureolineata
Gastropods described in 2018